Cliff Robert Martinez (born February 5, 1954) is an American musician and composer. Early in his career, Martinez was known as a drummer notably with the Red Hot Chili Peppers and Captain Beefheart. Since the 1990s, he has worked primarily as a film score composer, writing music for Spring Breakers,  The Foreigner, and multiple films by Steven Soderbergh (Sex, Lies, and Videotape, Solaris, Contagion, and Traffic) and Nicolas Winding Refn (Drive, Only God Forgives, The Neon Demon and the miniseries Too Old to Die Young).

On April 14, 2012, Martinez was inducted into the Rock and Roll Hall of Fame as a member of the Red Hot Chili Peppers.

Early life
Martinez was born in the Bronx, New York. His grandfather migrated from a small village in Spain to the United States. Raised in Columbus, Ohio, his first job composing was for the popular television show Pee Wee's Playhouse. At the time, however, he was more interested in rock bands, and played drums in a variety of them, mostly in a temporary capacity.

Red Hot Chili Peppers (1983–1986)
After several years drumming for such acts as Captain Beefheart, The Dickies, Lydia Lunch and The Weirdos, in late 1983, he and Jack Sherman were drafted in to join the Red Hot Chili Peppers for the recording of their eponymous first album after Jack Irons and Hillel Slovak left the band to concentrate on their other project at the time, What Is This? Martinez again played on the recording of the band's second album Freaky Styley and its subsequent tour.

In 2012 Martinez was inducted into the Rock and Roll Hall of Fame as a member of the Red Hot Chili Peppers. Martinez performed with the band for the first time in 26 years when he joined them along with former drummer Jack Irons on their song, "Give It Away" during the ceremony.

Film composing
Eventually, Martinez' interests shifted and he focused his attention toward film scoring. A tape Martinez had put together using new technologies made its rounds, leading him to score an episode of Pee-Wee's Playhouse. The same recording also ended up in Steven Soderbergh's hands and Martinez was hired to score the famed director's first theatrical release, 1989's Sex, Lies, and Videotape.  Martinez's longstanding relationship with Soderbergh has continued through the years and they have worked together on ten theatrical releases including Kafka, The Limey, Traffic, Solaris and 2011's Contagion, as well the Cinemax series The Knick.

His nontraditional scores tend towards being stark and sparse, utilizing a modern tonal palette to paint the backdrop for films that are often dark, psychological stories like Pump Up the Volume (1990), The Limey (1999) Wonderland (2003), Wicker Park (2004) and Drive (2011).  Martinez has been nominated for a Grammy Award (Steven Soderbergh's Traffic), a Cesar Award (Xavier Giannoli's À L'origine), and a Broadcast Film Critics Award (Drive).  He earned a Robert Award (Danish Academy Award) for his work on Only God Forgives.

Martinez's use of audio manipulations, particularly for percussive sounds, has been evolving through the years and is evident by the hammered dulcimer of Kafka (1991), the gray-areas between sound design and score for Traffic (2000), the steel drums and textures of Solaris (2002), what Martinez called "rhythmi-tizing pitched, ambient textures" of Narc (2002), and "using percussion performances to trigger and shape the rhythmic and tonal characteristics of those ambient textures," as he described his score for 2011's The Lincoln Lawyer.

Martinez served as a juror for the 2012 Sundance Film Festival and served on the International Feature nominating committee for 2011 Film Independent Spirit Awards. Martinez's recent films include Robert Redford's The Company You Keep, Nicholas Jarecki's Arbitrage, Harmony Korine's Spring Breakers (co-composed with Skrillex), and Nicolas Winding Refn's Only God Forgives and The Neon Demon.

Video game composing
Martinez composed the main menu music titled "Galaxy Theme" for Spore in 2008. In 2014, Martinez also composed the title score for Far Cry 4.

Advertising
In 2013, Martinez scored the "Fly Beyond" Grey Goose vodka commercial. Martinez also composed two songs, "Vibe" and "Kotopulse", for the 2014 Lincoln Motor Company advertising campaign featuring Matthew McConaughey.

Discography

The Weirdos
 Weird World (compilation)

Lydia Lunch
 13.13 (1982)
 Stinkfist (1986)

Captain Beefheart
 Ice Cream for Crow (1982)

Red Hot Chili Peppers
 The Red Hot Chili Peppers (1984)
 Freaky Styley (1985)
 The Abbey Road E.P. – (1988)
 What Hits!? – (1992)
 Out in L.A. – (1994)
 Under the Covers: Essential Red Hot Chili Peppers – (1998)

The Dickies
 Killer Klowns From Outer Space (1988)
 The Second Coming (1989)
 Locked N' Loaded Live in London (1991)
 Idjit Savant (1994)

As composer

Film

Television

Video games

References

External links
 
 

1954 births
Hispanic and Latino American musicians
American film score composers
American rock drummers
BAFTA winners (people)
Living people
American male film score composers
Red Hot Chili Peppers members
The Magic Band members
Video game composers
20th-century American drummers
American male drummers
American people of Spanish descent